Torulosa may refer to:

Allocasuarina torulosa (Rose She-Oak or Forest Oak), a tree which grows in sub-rainforest of Queensland and New South Wales, Australia
Cupressus torulosa, species of cypress
Deightoniella torulosa, plant pathogen
Epioblasma torulosa, species of freshwater mussel, an aquatic bivalve mollusk in the family Unionidae, the river mussels
Fuscoporia torulosa, species of bracket fungus in the Fuscoporia genus, family Hymenochaetaceae